Burry Willie Stander (16 September 1987 – 3 January 2013) was a South African mountain biker, the UCI Mountain Bike World Cup under-23 men's cross-country 2009 world champion.

In the 2008 Summer Olympics, held in Beijing, Stander finished 15th in the cross-country mountain bike race. In the 2012 Summer Olympics, held in London, Stander finished 5th in the cross-country mountain bike race.

Stander paired up with Christoph Sauser in 2009 for the Absa Cape Epic. Although the team only managed 6th place that year, they then came back in 2010 to claim 2nd place. Finally in 2011 Stander and Sauser finished in 1st place, making Stander the first South African rider to win the Absa Cape Epic. In 2012 the team were victorious once again, winning the Prologue and four of the seven stages of the marathon stage race.

Stander died on 3 January 2013 after being hit by a taxibus while finishing a training ride and returning to his Concept Cyclery Shop in South Africa. The KwaZulu-Natal minibus taxi driver who struck Stander down was convicted of culpable homicide on 17 April 2015 at the Port Shepstone Magistrates Court, and was sentenced to three years in prison.

Career highlights

2006 to 2007
 3 time U/19 SA XC and Marathon champion
 10th Commonwealth Games 2006
 17th U/23 World Championships 2006
 South African Pro XC champion 2006/2007
 6th U/23 world championships 2007
 African XC MTB champion 2007
 sponsor GT Bicycles / Omnico SA

2008
 Mazda Drifter Barberton SA marathon series opener 1st
 14th Giro del Capo Road Tour and second u/26 rider
 Absa Cape Epic stage win and leader for three stages (did not finish due to injury while leading)
 South Africa Cross Country champion
 3rd U/23 SA Road Championships
 World Cup round 1 Houffalize Belgium 58th
 World Cup round 2 Offenburg Germany 7th
 World Cup round 3 Madrid, Spain 13th
 World Cup round 4 Vallnord, Andorra 2nd
 World Cup round 5 Fort William Scotland 5th
 World Cup round 6 Mont St Anne, Canada 3rd
 World Cup round 7 Bromont Canada 24th
 World Cup round 8 Canberra Australia 6th
 World Cup round 9 Schladming Austria 10th
 World Cup overall standings 5th
 World Cup u/23 champion
 U/23 World Championships 2nd
 Jeep Hill2Hill Marathon champion
 Summer Olympic Games in Beijing 15th
 Sponsor GT Bicycles / Omnico SA
 2009 sponsors: Specialized Bikes, Mr Price, Oakley, Fever publications-weekly mountainbike column, Fast Fuel Nutrition, Crank Brothers Pedals, Garmin, Songo.info-charity involved in building BMX tracks for disadvantaged communities.

In 2010, Stander rode across the line in third place at the Mountain Bike World Championships in Mont-Sainte-Anne, Quebec, Canada.

He won the Absa Cape Epic back to back with team partner Christoph Sauser in 2011 and 2012.

In the 2012 Summer Olympic Games in London he finished 5th.

Personal life
Stander hailed from Port Shepstone in KwaZulu-Natal where he attended an Afrikaans Primary and High School (Suid-Natal). He married fellow cyclist Cherise Taylor in May 2012 on the beach of Port Shepstone.

References

External links

 
 
 
 
 On the road with Burry Stander

1987 births
2013 deaths
People from Port Shepstone
White South African people
South African male cyclists
Cross-country mountain bikers
Olympic cyclists of South Africa
Cyclists at the 2008 Summer Olympics
Cyclists at the 2012 Summer Olympics
Cycling road incident deaths
Road incident deaths in South Africa
South African mountain bikers